Kamalini Nagarajan Dutt also known as Kamalini Dutt is a Producer and Kathak Dancer based in India. She has worked mostly for Doordarshan and has been the major reason behind the restoration of old and decaying database (performances and Interviews of different Notable Artistes).

References

Living people
Indian dancers
Kathakali exponents
Year of birth missing (living people)